Cranberry is an unincorporated community in Raleigh County, West Virginia, United States.

The community takes its name from nearby Cranberry Creek.

References

Unincorporated communities in Raleigh County, West Virginia
Unincorporated communities in West Virginia
Coal towns in West Virginia